Highway 980 (AR 980, Ark. 980, and Hwy. 980) is a state highway designation for all state maintained airport roads in Arkansas.

List of routes

Arkansas County

Almyra

It connects Arkansas Highway 130 with Almyra Municipal Airport in Almyra.

Section 2

It connects U.S. Route 165 with De Witt Municipal Airport in south De Witt.

Benton County

It connects AR 59 with Smith Field in Siloam Springs.

Boone County

It connects US 62/US 65/US 412 with the Boone County Airport in Harrison.

History
The highway was designated by the Arkansas State Highway Commission on March 26, 1975.

Major intersections

Bradley County

It connects US 63/AR 8 with the Warren Municipal Airport south of Warren.

Carroll County

It connects US 62 with the Carroll County Airport near Berryville.

Chicot County

Section 1

It connects US 165 with the Dermott Municipal Airport near Dermott.

Section 2

It connects US 65 with the Lake Village Municipal Airpott Municipal Airport near Lake Village.

Clay County

Section 1

It connects US 62/US 67 (Future I-57) with the Corning Municipal Airport near Corning.

Section 2

It connects US 49/AR 1 with the Rector Airport near Rector.

Cleburne County

It connects Arkansas Highway 210 with the Heber Springs Municipal Airport in Heber Springs.

Columbia County

The route connects U.S. Route 79 with Magnolia Municipal Airport south of Magnolia.

Conway County

It connects AR 9 with the Morrilton Airport in Morrilton.

Cross County

The route connects Arkansas Highway 1 with Wynne Municipal Airport in Wynne.

Desha County

Section 1

The route connects Arkansas Highway 4 with McGehee Municipal Airport in McGehee. The route was shortened on January 7, 2009.

Section 2

The route connects Arkansas Highway 54 with Billy Free Municipal Airport near Dumas.

Drew County

The route connects U.S. Route 278 with Ellis Field in east Monticello.

Fulton County

It connects AR 9 with the Salem Airport in Salem.

Howard County

The route connects U.S. Route 371 with Howard County Airport north of Nashville.

Lawrence County

It connects US 67 with the Walnut Ridge Regional Airport in College City.

Madison County

It connects AR 74 with the Huntsville - Madison County Municipal Airport in Huntsville.

Marion County

It connects AR 178 with the Marion County Regional Airport in Flippin.

Polk County

It connects Arkansas Highway 8 with the Mena Intermountain Municipal Airport in Mena.

Van Buren County

It connects AR 16 with the Clinton Municipal Airport in Clinton.

Former routing

It connected AR 126 with Ozark Regional Airport in Midway. It was removed from the State Highway system on April 27, 2007.

References

980